Mkutano Meets the Culture Musical Club of Zanzibar is an album by American blues artist Taj Mahal.

Track listing
All songs written by Taj Mahal except as noted.
 "Dhow Countries"   – 7:48 
 "Muhoga wa jang'ombe" (Maalim Shaaban) – 6:11 
 "Zanzibar"   – 3:19
 "Catfish Blues"  – 6:22
 "Naahidi Kulienzi" (Makame Faki, Fatma Abdisalam) – 5:53
 "Mkutano"  – 3:52
 "Done Changed My Way of Living"  – 5:29
 "M'Banjo"  – 3:29
 "Mpunga " (Chimbeni Kheri) – 6:05

Personnel
 Taj Mahal - Banjo
 Kester Smith - Drums
 Bill Rich - Electric Bass
 Foum Faki - Dumbak, Bongos
 Mahmoud Juma - Double Bass
 Salah Yussuf - Dumbak, Bongos
 Rajab Suleiman - Gamun, Accordion
 Said Nassor - Udi
 Said Mwinyi - Accordion
 Haj Juma Wadi - Nai
 Taimur Rukun - Accordion
 Amour Haj - Sanduku
 Kesi Juma - First Violin
 Juma Shadhili - Violin
 Juma Abdallah - Violin
 Bikidude - Vocals
 Rukia Ramadhani - Vocals
 Makame Faki - Vocals

References

Taj Mahal (musician) albums
2005 albums